Eburella pinima is a species of beetle in the family Cerambycidae.

References

Eburiini
Beetles described in 1997